The Type XVII U-boats were small coastal submarines that used a high-test peroxide propulsion system, which offered a combination of air-independent propulsion and high submerged speeds.

Background
In the early 1930s Hellmuth Walter had designed a small, high-speed submarine with a streamlined form propelled by high-test peroxide (HTP) and in 1939 he was awarded a contract to build an experimental vessel, the 80 ton , which achieved an underwater speed of  during trials in 1940. In November 1940 Admirals Erich Raeder and Werner Fuchs (head of the Kriegsmarines Construction Office) witnessed a demonstration of the V-80; Raeder was impressed, but Fuchs was slow to approve further tests.

Following the success of the V-80's trials, Walter contacted Karl Dönitz in January 1942, who enthusiastically embraced the idea and requested that these submarines be developed as quickly as possible. An initial order was placed in summer 1942 for four Type XVIIA development submarines.

Construction

In June 1944 U-792 achieved  over a measured mile.

The Type XVIIA submarines were found to be very hard to handle at high speed, and were plagued by numerous mechanical problems, low efficiency, and the fact that a significant amount of power was lost due to increased back pressure on the exhaust at depth. Also, the length to beam ratio was too low, resulting in an unnecessarily high drag.

Admiral Fuchs argued that introducing a new type of U-boat would hinder current production efforts, but Dönitz argued the case for them and on 4 January 1943 the Kriegsmarine ordered 24 Type XVII submarines.

Construction of operational Type XVII submarines – the Type XVIIB – was begun at the Blohm + Voss yard in Hamburg. The Type XVIIB, unlike the XVIIA, had only a single turbine. The initial order was for 12 submarines, U-1405 through U-1416. However, Blohm + Voss were already struggling to cope with orders for Type XXI submarines and the Kriegsmarine reduced the order to six.

Projected types
Twelve Type XVIIG of slightly improved design, U-1081 through U-1092, were at the same time ordered from Germaniawerft.

A projected Type XVIIK would have abandoned the Walter system for closed-cycle Diesel engines using pure oxygen from onboard tanks.

Completed boats
Three Type XVIIB boats were completed by Blohm + Voss of Hamburg between 1943 and 1945:  ,  and  U-1407. U-1405 was completed in December 1944, U-1406 in February 1945, and U-1407 in March 1945.

A further three boats (U-1408 to U-1410) were under construction, but were not complete when the war ended. Another six Type XVIIB's (U-1411 to U-1416)  were cancelled during the war in favour of the Type XXI submarine.

Post war

All three completed Type XVIIB boats were scuttled by their crews at the end of World War II, U-1405 at Flensburg, and U-1406 and U-1407 at Cuxhaven, all in the British Zone of Occupation. U-1406 and U-1407 were scuttled on 7 May 1945 by Oberleutnant zur See Gerhard Grumpelt, even though a superior officer, Kapitän zur See Kurt Thoma, had prohibited such actions. Grumpelt was subsequently sentenced to 7 years imprisonment by a British military court.

At the Potsdam Conference in July 1945 U-1406 was allocated to the United States and U-1407 to Britain, and both were soon salvaged. The uncompleted U-1408 and U-1410 were discovered by British forces at the Blohm + Voss yard in Hamburg.

The United States Navy did not repair and operate U-1406 as it had with the two Type XXI submarines it had captured. She travelled to the United States as deck cargo, having been stripped after being damaged by fire and twice flooded. Portsmouth Naval Shipyard estimated it would cost $1 million to put her into service, but plans to do so were rejected due to the perceived fire hazard and high cost of HTP, and she was broken up in New York harbour some time after 18 May 1948.

List of boats
Type XVIIA

Wa 201 — Blohm + Voss, Hamburg
 
 

Wk 202 — Germaniawerft, Kiel
 
 

Type XVIIB — Blohm + Voss, Hamburg

  — scuttled on 5 May 1945
  — scuttled on 7 May 1945, raised, and transported to the U.S.; broken up some time after 18 May 1948
 U-1407 — scuttled on 7 May 1945, raised, repaired and served as  until September 1949
 U-1408 – 1410 — incomplete when the war ended
 U-1411 – 1416 — contract cancelled before construction began

References

Bibliography

Submarine classes
 
World War II submarines of Germany